Robert Alexander Bowman (born 21 November 1975) is an English footballer who played professionally for Leeds United, Rotherham United and Carlisle United.

Career
Bowman was a defender who represented Leeds United, Rotherham United, Carlisle United, Bohemian F.C. and Gateshead F.C. amongst others during his career. He made his first team debut for Leeds as a 17-year-old and won the FA Youth Cup with Leeds in 1993 against a Manchester United side which included the likes of Gary Neville and Paul Scholes. He appeared in the famous Jimmy Glass game against Plymouth Argyle, in which the goalkeeper scored in the 94th minute to keep Carlisle United in the Football League.

He played in the UEFA Europa League for Bohemians in 2000/2001.

References

External links

England FA profile

1975 births
Living people
English footballers
English expatriate footballers
Association football defenders
League of Ireland players
Bohemian F.C. players
Leeds United F.C. players
Rotherham United F.C. players
Carlisle United F.C. players
Gateshead F.C. players
Premier League players
English Football League players
English expatriate sportspeople in Ireland
Expatriate association footballers in the Republic of Ireland